The Islamabad Policy Research Institute (IPRI), established in 1999, is one of the oldest non-partisan think-tanks. It is affiliated with the National Security Division (NSD), Government of Pakistan. National Security Advisor (NSA) to the Prime Minister of Pakistan, Dr. Moeed Yusuf, is the ex-Officio Patron of IPRI.

Using both primary and secondary sources, a widely recognized research-based work of the institute encompasses all facets of National Security, ranging from international relations & lawfare, strategic studies, governance & public policy and economic security in Pakistan. 

IPRI is ranked 74th in Best Government Affiliated Think Tanks category according to 2020 Global Go To Think Tank Index Report.

Research and analysis 
The institute has been providing well researched policy inputs to government besides contributing towards generation of new ideas through rigorous academic research.  The institute has an eclectic mix of researchers,  practitioners, and academics that form the research pool besides a strong communications team for national as well as international outreach.  The research products include academic papers, policy briefs, empirical studies/ surveys, conference papers and books on diverse topics of contemporary relevance.  IPRI’s Journal is an HEC accredited publications that is published biannually and contains meticulously researched articles contributed by leading national as well as international writers.

IPRI has reoriented itself into a modern think tank with a diversified research portfolio aimed at the provision of actionable policy input to policy making hubs and government ministries in the shape of well researched policy briefs on topics of contemporary relevance. The institute continues to make major progress in its research and communications activities by holding seminars, roundtables, guest lectures, national & international conferences, seminars, webinars, training workshops, and in-house presentations/discussions for discussing key national and international issues to project national narrative, besides formulating possible solutions and recommendations for the policy makers.

Research philosophy 

 Original, Non-Partisan & Collaborative (Research Driving the Policy)
Policy & Scholarly Research (Innovating Research through Data Analytics and Technology)
 Actionable Policy Input (Providing Solution-driven Input)

Research areas 

 International Relations and Lawfare                 
Strategic Studies                         
 Public Policy & Governance
 Economic Security

Publications 
IPRI's publications include:

 IPRI Journal – Scholarly biannual journal showcasing research in international relations, political science, geopolitics, defense, strategic studies, diplomacy, security, terrorism, conflict, public policy and governance.
Books – Based on selected topics besides anthologies showcasing conference papers.
 IPRI Papers – Expanded research on topical subjects.
 Policy Briefs – 4–6 page policy write-up for the government on matters of national security which is a short summary of an issue. Policy briefs generally embody actionable recommendations prepared for government policymakers.
 IPRI Newsletter – Monthly round-up of IPRI's activities.
 Analytics & Projections – 1–2 pages of analysis and forecasting on national security issued daily by the communication team of IPRI.

Strategic Communications 

The Strategic Communications team of IPRI always looks for effective channels to give traction to own research initiatives. Introducing data analytics and technology in the think tanks of Pakistan has largely brought in a new approach premised on illustrative understanding through infographics, well-researched explainers, and digital media show.

Aimed at strategic policy planning, the branch articulates the strategies for organizational growth and plans outreach initiatives to advance the goals accordingly. Using dialogue platforms such as webinars and track initiatives, IPRI helps project Pakistan's narrative at the global level. IPRI facilitates high level discussions on matters of strategic importance. For instance, the distinguished lecture series hosts notable policy practitioners for discussions on topics such as Afghanistan. Aimed at fostering an environment of scholarly debate, IPRI became proud partner of Islamabad Security Dialogue, the first national security dialogue in Pakistan.

Margalla Dialogue is another signature event that showcases national and international scholars contributing towards a healthy debate on issues spanning a wide gamut of public policy, security, development and economics.

Leadership 
Dr. Moeed Yusuf, National Security Advisor (NSA) to the Prime Minister of Pakistan, is the Ex-Officio Patron of IPRI while Brig. (R) Raashid Wali Janjua is the Acting President and Director Research of IPRI. Dr. Hussain Nadim is the Executive Director (Communications and Reforms). Based on practitioners, academics and renowned researchers of international repute, the institute is steered by a board of governors and expert advisory board, who meet annually to review its progress.

Board of Governors

Chairman 

 Amb. (R) Inamul Haque

Members 

 Senator Anwar ul Haq Kakar
 Ahmer Bilal Soofi
 Lt. Gen. (R) Naeem Khalid Lodhi
 Amb. (R) Fauzia Nasreen
 Hussain Dawood
 Amb. Ali Jehangir Siddiqui
 Vice Adm. (R) Shahid Iqbal
 Dr. Umar Saif

Ex officio members 

 Foreign Minister of Pakistan
 Minister for Information and Broadcasting, Pakistan
 Ex Officio Patron of IPRI
 Chairman HEC
 Amb. (R) Aizaz Ahmad Chaudhry

See also
 Government of Pakistan
 National Security Advisor (Pakistan)
Higher Education Commission, Pakistan
 Institute of Strategic Studies Islamabad  
 Centre for Aerospace and Security Studies
Institute of Strategic Studies, Research & Analysis - ISSRA
Sustainable Development Policy Institute
Institute of Regional Studies

References

External links
 

Foreign policy and strategy think tanks based in Pakistan
1999 establishments in Pakistan